A lay theologian is a theologian "who is not ordained, or a theologian who has not been trained as a theologian". Lay theologians often have academic qualifications in other academic disciplines.

Examples 
Notable lay theologians include:

References

Christian theologians